ISE America is a privately owned company that is the 17th largest producer of chicken eggs in the United States and is wholly owned by the Japanese food conglomerate ISE Foods Co., Ltd., which is that nation's largest egg producer, and the 6th largest egg producer in the world.

History 

Founded in 1980, ISE America is based in Galena, Maryland and produces eggs for retail, food service, and further processor markets, whose products include shell, hard cooked, liquid/frozen, and farms eggs, as well as pasteurized eggs. It is, also, entirely integrated, operating its own breeder, hatchery, feed mills, and pullet farms and has other offices in New Jersey and South Carolina. In 2001, The Washington Post reported that ISE America had been accused by animal rights activists of cruelty regarding their treatment of chickens.

Corporate affairs 

 Doug Wicker: Vice President
 Gregg Clanton: Vice President
 Larry Beck: Chief Information Officer, Chief Technology Officer, Chief Sales Officer
 Denise Ford: Controller

Cultural initiatives 

In 1983, ISE America founded the nonprofit organization ISE Cultural Foundation in New York City to promote cross-cultural exchanges (United States–Japan) in the arts, mainly in visual arts, and whom, in 2015, received a Consul General's Commendation from the Consulate General of Japan in New York.

References

External links 

 
  (イセ食品株式会社) – Japanese

Manufacturing companies based in Maryland
American subsidiaries of foreign companies
Food and drink companies established in 1980
Eggs (food)